This is a list of Malaysia international footballers born outside their country, including naturalised and overseas players.

Naturalised players 
In January 1984, Razali Alias of Singapore became the first naturalised player in Malaysia. He made his debut for the Malaysia national team in a friendly match against the United Arab Emirates in March 1985. The Football Association of Malaysia (FAM) tried to register him for the 1986 FIFA World Cup qualification, however, FIFA prevented him from participating as he was already capped for Singapore. The second naturalised player in Malaysia was Ahmad Paijan of Singapore who received his Malaysian citizenship in late 1995 after 13 years of playing for Terengganu.

In late 2018, there have been more necessities to naturalising foreign players to improve Malaysian football performances. Based on three survey polls conducted by the country three local press, two of them recording a majority positive vote over the necessities to acquire foreign players as a local players. As a result, the FAM began submitting a plan to the federal government. The plan was welcomed by the country prime minister with the latter also urging local talents to improve in par with the absorption of foreign talents.

List of players

Notes

References 

Football in Malaysia
Footballers in Malaysia
Malaysia
Association football player non-biographical articles